Patlıcanlı kebap (also known as patlıcan kebabı, Gaziantep dialect of Turkish: balcan kebabı) is a Turkish kebab (meat dish) that may be prepared according to various traditions.

One style of eggplant kebab consists of pieces of eggplant layered alternately with fine-chopped (not minced) meat such as beef and lamb. It may be assembled on a skewer and cooked over a fire.  (oven-baked eggplant kebab) can be made with skewers in a dish, or the ingredients arranged in a circular pan, with spices such as pepper, and eaten with raw onions and a soft Turkish flatbread, called yufka, or with lavaş. In the area of Şanlıurfa Birecik and other parts of Southern Turkey, people traditionally would prepare a tray of patlıcanlı kebap from leftover eggplant and chicken meat at home, then take it to a local bakery to be cooked in the wood-fired oven.

The aubergines are first sliced and fried in oil. The meat is sauteed separately. Then the meat pieces are wrapped in fried eggplant slices and joined together with a toothpick. This is decorated with tomato and/or green bellpepper slices. Then the meal is put into an oven and cooked until the meat is tender. The juice is richened by the addition of some diluted salça (a very concentrated tomato paste from Turkey).

See also
 List of kebabs
 List of eggplant dishes

References

External links
 

Kebabs
Turkish cuisine
Turkish stews
Middle Eastern grilled meats
Turkish words and phrases
Eggplant dishes